Andrey Mamontov (born 6 August 1981) is a Belarusian diver. He competed in the men's 10 metre platform event at the 2004 Summer Olympics.

References

1981 births
Living people
Belarusian male divers
Olympic divers of Belarus
Divers at the 2004 Summer Olympics
Sportspeople from Voronezh